Mr Meeson's Will is an 1888 novel by H. Rider Haggard. It was based on a well known anecdote of the time. The plot concerns a marooned man's will tattooed on the back of a woman.

Adaptation
It was turned into silent films in 1915 and 1916 (as The Grasp of Greed with Lon Chaney).

References

External links
Complete book at Project Gutenberg
Mr Meeson's Will (1915 film) at IMDb
Images and bibliographic information for various editions of Mr. Meeson's Will at SouthAfricaBooks.com

Novels by H. Rider Haggard
British adventure novels
British novels adapted into films
1888 British novels
Kerguelen Islands
Novels set on islands
Novels set in the Indian Ocean